County Road 17 or County Road 17 may refer to:

 County Road 17 (Polk County, Florida)
 County Road 17 (Elkhart County, Indiana)
 County Road 17 (Anoka County, Minnesota)
 County Road 17 (Chisago County, Minnesota)
 County Road 17 (Hennepin County, Minnesota)
 County Road 17 (Scott County, Minnesota)
 County Route 17 (Monmouth County, New Jersey)
 County Route 17 (Allegany County, New York)
 County Route 17 (Cattaraugus County, New York)
 County Route 17 (Clinton County, New York)
 County Route 17 (Columbia County, New York)
 County Route 17 (Delaware County, New York)
 County Route 17 (Dutchess County, New York)
 County Route 17 (Essex County, New York)
 County Route 17 (Franklin County, New York)
 County Route 17 (Genesee County, New York)
 County Route 17 (Niagara County, New York)
 County Route 17 (Oneida County, New York)
 County Route 17 (Ontario County, New York)
 County Route 17 (Orange County, New York)
 County Route 17 (Oswego County, New York)
 County Route 17 (Otsego County, New York)
 County Route 17 (Putnam County, New York)
 County Route 17 (Rockland County, New York)
 County Route 17 (Schoharie County, New York)
 County Route 17 (Schuyler County, New York)
 County Route 17 (St. Lawrence County, New York)
 County Route 17 (Steuben County, New York)
 County Route 17 (Suffolk County, New York)
 County Route 17 (Tioga County, New York)
 County Route 17 (Warren County, New York)
 County Route 17 (Washington County, New York)
 County Route 17 (Yates County, New York)